Karl Jakob Hein (born 13 April 2002) is an Estonian professional footballer who plays as a goalkeeper for  club Arsenal and the Estonia national team.

Club career

Nõmme United
Hein began his youth career at JK Loo at the age of eight, before moving to the youth team of Nõmme United in 2015. He made five senior appearances for Nõmme United in the Estonian third tier, Esiliiga B, before joining the academy of English club Arsenal in May 2018.

Arsenal
Hein signed his first professional contract with the club in May 2019. He appeared in the Arsenal squad as an unused substitute for the first time on 29 October 2020, in the Europa League match against Dundalk.

After playing for the Arsenal first-team in the 2021–22 pre-season, including his non-competitive debut against Hibernian, Hein signed a new long-term contract with Arsenal on 17 September 2021.

On 10 November 2022, Hein made his debut for the Arsenal first-team in the EFL Cup third round against Brighton & Hove Albion at the Emirates Stadium, conceding a foul in the penalty area and the resulting spot-kick against Danny Welbeck as Arsenal lost 3-1.

Loan to Reading
On 24 January 2022, Reading announced the signing of Hein on loan from Arsenal until the end of the 2021–22 season.

International career
Hein was capped by Estonia at under-17, under-19 and under-21 level. He made his international debut for the Estonia national team on 5 September 2020, in a 0–1 loss against Georgia in the UEFA Nations League.

Career statistics

Club

International

Honours
International
Baltic Cup: 2020

Individual
Estonian Young Footballer of the Year: 2020, 2021

References

External links
 
 
 

2002 births
Living people
People from Põlva
Estonian footballers
Estonia youth international footballers
Estonia under-21 international footballers
Estonia international footballers
Estonian expatriate footballers
Estonian expatriate sportspeople in England
Expatriate footballers in England
Association football goalkeepers
Arsenal F.C. players
FC Nõmme United players